The following is a list of Dark Sun modules and sourcebooks:

2nd Edition Advanced Dungeons & Dragons
 Rulebooks
 
 
 
 Accessories
 
 
 
 
 
 
 
 
 
 
 
 
 
 
 
 
 Adventures
 
 
 
 
 
 
 
 
 
 Box Sets

3rd Edition

Paizo's Dark Sun

Athas.org's Dark Sun
 Rule Books
 
 
 Accessories

4th Edition
 Rule Book
 
 Accessories
 
 
 Adventures
 Bloodsand Arena (Free RPG Day, June 2010)
 Marauders of the Dune Sea (August 2010)

Footnotes

Dark Sun
Dungeons & Dragons books
Eberron